Visa requirements for Paraguayan citizens are administrative entry restrictions imposed by the authorities of foreign states on citizens of Paraguay.  Paraguayan citizens had visa-free or visa on arrival access (including eTAs) to 142 countries and territories, ranking the Paraguayan passport 37th in the world in terms of travel freedom according to the Henley Passport Index.

In order to travel to another country, Paraguayan citizens require a passport, except for travel to full and associated member states of Mercosur (except for Guyana and Suriname) where a civil identity card (Cédula de Identidad Civil) suffices.

Visa requirements map

Visa requirements
Visa requirements for holders of normal passports travelling for tourist purposes:

Paraguay is a full member of Mercosur. As such, its citizens enjoy unlimited access to any of the other full members (Argentina, Brazil and Uruguay) and the associated members of Bolivia, Chile, Colombia, Ecuador and Peru with the right to residence and work, with no requirement other than nationality. Citizens of these nine countries (including Paraguay) may apply for the grant of temporary residence for up to two years in another country of the bloc. Then, they may apply for permanent residence just before the term of their temporary residence expires.

Territories and disputed areas
Visa requirements for Paraguayan citizens for visits to various territories, disputed areas and restricted zones:

Non-visa restrictions

See also

 Visa policy of Paraguay
Paraguayan passport

References and Notes
References

Notes

Government of Paraguay
Paraguay